See also McRae (disambiguation) and MacRae (disambiguation)

McCrae is a surname. Notable people with the surname include:

Alex McCrae, Scottish footballer
Andrew McCrae (1886–1915), Scottish footballer
David McCrae, Scottish footballer
George McCrae, American soul and disco singer
Sir George McCrae, Scottish textile merchant and politician
George Gordon McCrae, Australian poet
Georgiana McCrae, Australian painter and diarist
Gwen McCrae, American R&B singer
Hugh McCrae, Australian writer
James McCrae (footballer), Scottish footballer
James McCrae (politician) politician in Manitoba, Canada
John McCrae, Canadian poet, physician, author, artist and soldier
Robert McCrae, Scottish footballer
Romone McCrae, British footballer
Stewart McCrae, Australian cartoonist
Stewart McCrae (politician), politician from Alberta, Canada
Thomas McCrae (politician), farmer, innkeeper and political figure in Upper Canada
Thomas McCrae (physician), Professor of Medicine at Jefferson Medical College
William McCrae, farmer and political figure in Upper Canada. Son of Thomas McCrae

Fictional characters:
Augustus "Gus" McCrae, a fictional Texas Ranger in the Lonesome Dove series
Captain B. McCrea,  the captain of the Axiom in the movie WALL-E.